Tom and Jerry Tales is an American-Canadian animated television series featuring the cat-and-mouse duo Tom and Jerry. Produced by Warner Bros. Animation and Turner Entertainment, it is the seventh installment in the Tom and Jerry franchise as well as the first Tom and Jerry production to emulate the original theatrical shorts created by Hanna-Barbera founders and former Metro-Goldwyn-Mayer cartoon studio staff William Hanna and Joseph Barbera for Metro-Goldwyn-Mayer; it originally ran in the United States from September 23, 2006 to March 22, 2008, on Kids' WB. This is the first Tom and Jerry television series from Warner Bros. Animation after parent company Time Warner had bought Turner Broadcasting System, then-owners of the franchise, in 1996.

Joseph Barbera served as executive producer for the series before his death on December 18, 2006 (making this the final Tom and Jerry project with his involvement), and received story credit on some episodes of the first season. The series consists of two seasons and 26 episodes, each consisting of three 7-minute segments with a shared theme and approximately the same length as the original theatrical shorts. Some shorts – like The Karate Guard – were produced and completed in 2005 (explaining the 2005 copyright stamp in the end credits of season 1 despite airing during the 2006–2007 season) as part of a 30-plus theatrical cartoon schedule canceled nearly two years after the financial failure of Looney Tunes: Back in Action.

Voice cast 

 Don Brown as Tom and Droopy (season 1)
William Hanna as Tom's additional screams (only in several season 1 episodes, archival audio recordings, uncredited) 
 Sam Vincent as Jerry, Sniffles and Kid
 Reece Thompson (season 1) and Chantal Strand as Tuffy
 Michael Donovan as Spike, Droopy (season 2) and Topsy
 Colin Murdock as Butch and Meathead
 Nicole Oliver as Mrs. Two-Shoes and Baby Booties
 Trevor Devall as Radio Announcer
 Carlos Alazraqui as Casper Lombardo 
 Ben Diskin as Ghost 2 
 Saffron Henderson as Playtpus Mother
 Ted Cole as Monkey
 Richard Newman as Narrator
 Kelly Sheridan as Miss Shapely
 Ashleigh Ball as Kangaroo Mother
 Maryke Hendrikse as Princess Alien Mouse
 Jennifer Hale as Kid 8, Additional voices
 Ellie Harvie as Rhino Mother
 Marieve Herington as Kid 12, Princess Additional voices
 Masasa Moyo as Girl 1, Additional voices
 Maxine Miller as Green Witch
 Ellen Kennedy as Purple Witch and Geraldine Mouse
 Jake D. Smith as Baby Mouse
 Cathy Weseluck as Thomasina
 Nicole Bouma as Little Girl
 Tabitha St. Germain as White Hero
 Cree Summer as Yellow Hero
 Ian James Corlett as Bunny
 Scott McNeil as Rocket Shop Owner
 David Kaye as Mauricio 
 Garry Chalk as Head Lifeguard
 Maurice LaMarche as Frankenstein
 Peter Kelamis as TV Announcer
 Janyse Jaud as Kitty 
 Michael Dobson as Male Kangaroo
 Sarah Chalke as Baby Mouse 2, Additional voices
 Erica Luttrell as Pele
 John Payne as Buster
 Andrea Libman as Toodles Galore
 Brian Drummond as Bear, Additional voices
 Louis Chirillo as Lion, Additional voices	
 Tara Strong as Lioness 2
 Paul Dobson as Drummer Rat 
 Kazumi Evans as Additional voices
 Matt Hill as Surf Competition Announcer
 Chuck Huber as Bellhop 
 Brigitte Bako as Lioness 3, Additional voices
 Peter New as Tony the Greasy Pizza Guy
 Erin Fitzgerald as Additional voices
 Katie Crown as Additional voices
 Jeannie Elias as Additional voices

Episodes

Overseas animation studios
 Yearim Productions (Seoul, South Korea)
 Lotto Animation (Seoul, South Korea) (season 1)
 Rough Draft Korea (Seoul, South Korea) (season 2)
 Toon City (Manila, Philippines)

Home media 

All six volumes were later released in 2-packs.

Video game 
On October 31, 2006, a video game based on the series was released for the Nintendo DS and Game Boy Advance. Developed by Sensory Sweep Studios, it was published by Warner Bros. Interactive Entertainment and also published by Eidos Interactive (Only in Europe and Australia). Playing as Jerry, the main objective of the game is to help Jerry get Tom into trouble. Many minor characters from the show make cameo appearances in the game, such as the female robotic mouse from the episode "Hi, Robot".

Notes

See also 
 The Tom and Jerry Show (1975)
 The Tom and Jerry Comedy Show
 Tom & Jerry Kids
 The Tom and Jerry Show (2014)
 Tom and Jerry Special Shorts
 Tom and Jerry in New York

References

External links 
 
 
 

2006 American television series debuts
2008 American television series endings
2000s American animated television series
2000s American surreal comedy television series
American children's animated comedy television series
English-language television shows
Kids' WB original shows
The CW original programming
Television series by Warner Bros. Animation
Television series by Hanna-Barbera
Television series set in 2006
Television series set in 2007
Television series set in 2008
Television shows set in the United States
Tom and Jerry television series
Animated television series reboots
Animated television series about cats
Animated television series about mice and rats